Caryocolum saginella is a moth of the family Gelechiidae. It is found in France, Austria, Switzerland, Italy, Croatia, Slovenia, North Macedonia and Greece.

The length of the forewings is 4.5–5 mm for males and 4–5 mm for females. The forewings are black with three white transverse fasciae at one-quarter, one-half and four-fifths. Adults have been recorded on wing from early June to late July.

The larvae feed on Silene saxifraga and Silene linoides. They feed in the shoots, causing terminal galls. Pupation takes place in a web on the ground. Larvae can be found in May and June.

References

Moths described in 1868
saginella
Moths of Europe